Sam Curtis (born 1 December 2005) is an Irish professional footballer who plays as a defender for League of Ireland Premier Division club St Patrick's Athletic.

Club career

Youth career
A native of Navan, County Meath, Curtis began playing with his local side Parkvilla, before moving to top Dublin youth side, St Kevin's Boys before moving to the academy of League of Ireland Premier Division club Shamrock Rovers. In June 2019, he captained the Dublin District Schoolboys League representative team to winning the prestigious Kennedy Cup. While at Rovers, he made his debut in senior football for the club's reserve team Shamrock Rovers II in Ireland's second tier, the League of Ireland First Division. His debut came on 17 October 2020 in a 3–1 win over Athlone Town at age 14, making him the youngest player in League of Ireland history. He spent time on trial at AS Roma and Bayer Leverkusen in the summer of 2021.

St Patrick's Athletic

2021 season
On 25 July 2021, it was announced that Curtis, as well as his brother Ben, had signed for St Patrick's Athletic, where they would initially play with the club's under 19 side. Curtis made his senior debut for the club came on 13 August 2021, replacing the injured Lee Desmond in injury time of a 2–1 win over Waterford at Richmond Park, making him the club's youngest ever player at 15 years and 255 days old. He made his UEFA Youth League debut on 29 September 2021 in a 2–1 loss to Serbian side Crvena Zvezda.

2022 season
Both Sam and brother Ben Curtis signed their first professional contracts on 20 January 2022. Curtis' first start for the club came on 6 May 2022 in a 4–0 win away to Drogheda United at United Park. His first appearances in European competition came in the summer of 2022 when he came off the bench in a 1–1 draw with NŠ Mura of Slovenia and in a 1–0 away win against Bulgarian side CSKA Sofia in the UEFA Europa Conference League. He made a total of 20 appearances in all competitions during his first full season at the club.  His form in his breakthrough season at the club led to reported interest from Manchester City and Chelsea.

International career
Curtis featured for the Republic of Ireland U15 side in 2019, captaining the side at age 13. He was a prominent player for the Republic of Ireland U17s during their qualification campaign over 2021–2022, scoring 2 goals in 6 appearances. Curtis captained the Republic of Ireland U18 side over 2021–2022. His first call up to the Republic of Ireland U19 team came in September 2022.

Career statistics

Honours
St Patrick's Athletic
FAI Cup: 2021

References

External links

2005 births
Living people
People from County Meath
Association football defenders
St Patrick's Athletic F.C. players
League of Ireland players
Association footballers from County Meath
Republic of Ireland association footballers
Republic of Ireland youth international footballers